The Newspaper Rock Petroglyphs Archeological District is part of the Petrified Forest National Park, and contains in excess of 650 petroglyphs, believed to have been created . This Apache County site near Adamana, Arizona was listed on the National Register of Historic Places  July 12, 1976.

See also
 
 
 National Register of Historic Places listings in Apache County, Arizona
 National Register of Historic Places listings in Petrified Forest National Park

References

National Register of Historic Places in Apache County, Arizona
Rock art
Petroglyphs in Arizona
Historic districts on the National Register of Historic Places in Arizona
National Register of Historic Places in Petrified Forest National Park